On 14 November 2014, the Greece national football team met the Faroe Islands national football team during a UEFA Euro 2016 qualifying match at Karaiskakis Stadium in Piraeus, Attica, Greece. To the surprise of many, the Faroe Islands won 1–0, with the only goal of the game coming from Jóan Símun Edmundsson, causing what many consider to be one of the biggest upsets in UEFA Euro qualifying history. It was the biggest shock in terms of FIFA World Rankings, as Greece were ranked 18th and the Faroe Islands were ranked 187th.

On 13 June 2015, the teams met in the return match at Tórsvøllur, Tórshavn. The Faroe Islands won again with a 2–1 scoreline. The games are considered by many Greeks to be one of their most humiliating defeats in international football, while many Faroese people consider the matches to be one of their greatest triumphs.

Background
The Greece national team had taken part in the 2014 FIFA World Cup in Brazil, reaching the round of 16 for the first time ever before being eliminated only on penalties by the surprising Costa Rica after a 1–1 draw in regulation time. Despite this, they didn't start well in the Euro qualifying, losing at home to Romania, drawing away with Finland and losing at home again to Northern Ireland. Greece had famously won the UEFA Euro 2004 tournament as huge underdogs, although only Kostas Katsouranis was still playing for the team following the World Cup ten years later and he did not take any part against the Faroes.

The Faroe Islands team started their campaign with three defeats: at home to Finland, away to Northern Ireland, and home to Hungary. They had not won a competitive international match away from home since beating Luxembourg in 2001 and had only three home wins since then. 

The respective populations of the countries at the time were approximately 10.93 million and 48,000.

2014 match

Details

Aftermath
The result caused the sacking of head coach Claudio Ranieri, whose next job would be manager of English club Leicester City the following July. In his first season, the club would go on to win the 2015–16 Premier League.

Before the return fixture, the Faroes suffered an away defeat to Romania, while Greece got a goalless away draw against Hungary.

2015 match

Details

Seven Greek players (goalkeeper Orestis Karnezis, Kostas Manolas, Panagiotis Kone, Lazaros Christodoulopoulos, Nikos Karelis, captain Vasilis Torosidis and Andreas Samaris) took part in both matches; on the Faroese side, nine players (goalkeeper Gunnar Nielsen, Atli Gregersen, Sonni Nattestad, Hallur Hansson, captain Fróði Benjaminsen, Brandur Olsen, Christian Holst, Jóan Símun Edmundsson and substitute Odmar Færø) took part in both.

Aftermath
Greece national team coach Sergio Markarián resigned in the following month, having lasted only two matches in charge.

The six points taken from the Greece fixtures were the only ones gained by the Faroese in the campaign. Greece got an away draw with Romania in September 2015 and finally won their first match on the last matchday, beating Hungary 4–3 at home, but it wasn't enough to avoid bottom place. Both teams finished with six points, the Faroes having the advantage on the head-to-head record.

References

External links

UEFA Euro 2016 qualifying
2014–15 in Greek football
2014 in Faroe Islands football
2015 in Faroe Islands football
UEFA European Championship matches
Greece
Faroe Islands
November 2014 sports events in Europe
June 2015 sports events in Europe
Sports competitions in Athens
Sport in Tórshavn